Perpetual Grace, LTD is an American neo-noir thriller television series that premiered on Epix on June 2, 2019.

The series is produced by MGM Television, with co-creators Steven Conrad and Bruce Terris writing each episode. The main cast features Ben Kingsley, Jimmi Simpson, Luis Guzmán, Damon Herriman, Chris Conrad, and Jacki Weaver; with Terry O'Quinn, Kurtwood Smith, Timothy Spall, and Michael Chernus in recurring roles.

On January 30, 2020, it was announced by Epix that the series was not renewed for a second season, but was planned to conclude with a limited run. However, Conrad stated, "under these terms, never going to happen".

Premise
Perpetual Grace, LTD follows "James, a young grifter, as he attempts to prey upon Pastor Byron Brown, who turns out to be far more dangerous than he suspects."

Cast and characters

Main
Ben Kingsley as Byron "Pa" Brown – A dangerous and manipulative pastor that runs a rehabilitation center, which he uses to steal from those he helps
Jimmi Simpson as James Schaeler – A disturbed ex-firefighter that is roped into Paul's scheme
Luis Guzmán as Hector Contreras – A Hermosillo sheriff that is tasked with imprisoning Ma and Pa
Damon Herriman as Paul Allen Brown – Ma and Pa's delinquent magician son who schemes to steal their money
Chris Conrad as Tracy "New Leaf" Connelly – One of Ma and Pa's former victims who believes that Paul is responsible for his misery
Jacki Weaver as Lillian "Ma" Brown – Pa's less violent but equally cunning wife

Recurring
Terry O'Quinn as Wesley Walker, a Texas Ranger that suspects Paul of murder
Kurtwood Smith as Dave Lesser, Lillian's falsely convicted sex offender foster brother
Timothy Spall as Donald DeLoash, a former criminal associate of Pa's
Michael Chernus as Everly Pirdoo, the town alcoholic and Glenn's father
Efren Ramirez as Felipe Guillermo Usted, a Mexican coroner who aids in Paul's scheme
Hana Mae Lee as Scotty Sholes, Pa's church's sardonic parishioner
Dana DeLorenzo as Valerie Spoonts, a crude car saleswoman that recruits Hector to be part of Paul's scheme 
Veronica Falcón as Clara, a cartel woman who seeks to kill Pa
Dash Williams as Glenn Pirdoo, a fifteen year-old boy forced to work in his father's pawn shop
Eliana Alexander as Marisol Contreras, Hector's loving wife
Alonso Alvarez as Emile Contreras, Hector's lazy son
Calvin Benuto as Matthias Contreras, Hector's lazy son

Episodes

Production

Development
On August 28, 2018, it was announced that Epix had given the production, then titled Our Lady, LTD, a series order for a first season consisting of ten episodes set to premiere in 2019. The series is written and showrun by Steven Conrad and Bruce Terris both of whom also executive produce alongside Todd Black, Jason Blumenthal, and Steve Tisch. Conrad directed six episodes of the series as well. The series is produced by MGM Television. On February 10, 2019, it was announced during the Television Critics Association's annual winter press tour that the series had been renamed Perpetual Grace, LTD.

Casting
Alongside the series order announcement, it was confirmed that Ben Kingsley would star in the series. On August 30, 2018, it was announced that Jimmi Simpson had been cast in a leading role. On September 4, 2018, it was reported that Jacki Weaver had been cast in a starring role. In November 2018, it was announced that Luis Guzmán, Damon Herriman, and Chris Conrad had been cast in series regular roles, that Kurtwood Smith and Terry O'Quinn would appear in a recurring capacity, and that Hana Mae Lee would appear in a guest role. On February 4, 2019, it was reported that Timothy Spall had been cast in a recurring role.

Filming
Principal photography for the series commenced in November 2018 in Santa Fe, New Mexico. Filming occurred in locations that month near Santa Fe including Los Cerrillos. In December 2018, shooting took place in Los Alamos with film sites including Los Alamos County Airport, Main Gate Park, Los Alamos National Bank, and DP Road. Filming was scheduled to last until March 2019.

Music
The original music for the series was created by The Jones Sisters, a band composed of series creator Steven Conrad, Guided by Voices' Bobby Bare Jr., Iron & Wine guitarist Jim Becker and The Autumn Defense bassist Brad Jones. The soundtrack was released on August 2, 2019, by Fat Possum Records. Alex Wurman composed the series' musical score.

Reception
On Rotten Tomatoes, the first season has an approval rating of 88% with an average score of 9.5 out of 10 based on 16 reviews. The site's critical consensus is, "Singularly strange, Perpetual Grace, LTD boasts a brilliant cast (led by a hypnotic turn from Ben Kingsley), impressive panoramas, and no shortage of twisty delights."

References

External links
 on Epix
Our Lady of Perpetual Grace LTD

2010s American drama television series
2019 American television series debuts
American thriller television series
English-language television shows
MGM+ original programming
Neo-noir television series
Nonlinear narrative television series
Television series by MGM Television
Television shows filmed in New Mexico
Television shows set in Mexico
Television shows set in New Mexico